Bruno Manuel Pires Silva (born 15 May 1981) is a Portuguese former professional road bicycle racer, who competed professionally between 2002 and 2016.

Major results

2004
 8th Overall Volta ao Alentejo
2005
 4th Overall Volta ao Alentejo
 5th Overall Vuelta a Asturias
2006
 1st  Road race, National Road Championships
 2nd Overall Troféu Joaquim Agostinho
 7th Overall Volta a Portugal
 10th Overall Volta ao Alentejo
2007
 1st Stage 4 Volta ao Alentejo
 3rd Overall GP Internacional Paredes Rota dos Móveis
1st Stage 4
2008
 2nd Prueba Villafranca de Ordizia
 3rd Overall Vuelta a Asturias
 5th Overall Volta ao Alentejo
1st Stage 4
 7th Subida al Naranco
2009
 2nd Overall Volta Ciclística de São Paulo
 9th Overall Volta a Portugal
2010
 6th Overall Volta ao Alentejo
1st Stage 2
2011
 9th Overall USA Pro Cycling Challenge
2012
 4th Overall Tour of Slovenia
2014
 10th Overall USA Pro Cycling Challenge
2016
 7th Overall Tour d'Azerbaïdjan

References

External links

1981 births
Living people
Portuguese male cyclists